The Bridge for Laboratory Sciences (shortened to the Bridge) is a two-story laboratory and classroom building on the campus of Vassar College in the town of Poughkeepsie, New York.

History
Vassar College in the town of Poughkeepsie, New York, began a project to completely renovate New England Building and Sanders Physics Building, partially renovate Olmsted Hall, and construct a new science center in 2011. In anticipation of the building's construction, Vassar's Environmental Research Institute, in conjunction with Cornell University's Cooperative Extension Dutchess County began to monitor the water quality of the Fonteyn Kill, a stream that runs through Vassar's campus over which the building was to be built. The Bridge for Laboratory Sciences (or the Bridge for short) cost $90 million in 2013. The main construction team was Daniel O'Connell and Sons with architectural design by Ennead Architects. The Bridge opened on January 4, 2016.

Architecture and features
On its other end, the building lets out near Skinner Hall for Music. Before the building's construction, people seeking to cross the Fonteyn Kill needed to descend a flight of stairs to cross a footbridge but the Bridge for Laboratory Sciences is compliant with the Americans with Disabilities Act, making it a more accessible link across the kill. A variety of techniques are being used to prevent birds from colliding with the Bridge for Laboratory Sciences, including shading fins and an ultraviolet glaze applied to exterior windows visible to birds but not to humans.

The structure is gently curved and supported by two concrete piles anchored in the wetland beneath. Curved trusses are built at the top of the structure with steel extensions built downward to support the building's two floors. The top-down construction was undergone in part to protect the riparian ecosystem below the structure. It totals  in floor space, making it Vassar's largest academic building.

Facilities in the Bridge include a wet laboratory, a robotics laboratory, a phytotron, a scientific visualization laboratory, machine and electric shops, a herbarium, an exterior patio, and a coffee shop. Faculty offices and multidisciplinary classroom–lab spaces for biology, chemistry, earth science, and environmental sciences are also part of the structure.

References

Further reading

External links
 
 Video tour of the Bridge from Vassar Chemistry Department

Vassar College buildings
University and college laboratories in the United States
School buildings completed in 2016
2010s architecture in the United States
2016 establishments in New York (state)